Angela Besharah (born August 12, 1977) is a Canadian actor, director, photographer and acting coach.

Early life
Besharah was born on August 12, 1977, in Ottawa, Ontario, Canada, and is of Lebanese, British and German descent.  Her mother worked in international development and her father is an architect. She started ballet at age four and continued to dance in ballet and jazz until her early teens. Besharah then took up the double bass and was a member of the Ottawa Youth Orchestra by the age of 12. At the age of 15, she was scouted to model in Milan, Italy. There, she landed her first big campaign for United Colors of Benetton.  Besharah continued to model internationally during summer breaks from school, working in Japan, Germany, Taiwan, the United States and Canada.

Though she originally enrolled at the University of Toronto to study environmental science, Besharah changed to the theatre program in her second year.  There, she played roles such as Ophelia in Hamlet and an old Newfoundland bag lady version of Gower in Pericles, Prince of Tyre.

Career

Acting 
Besharah's Toronto theatre debut was as Corey in Theatre Passe Muraille's Little Dragon.

Besharah first appeared on film in a music video directed by Sloan's Chris Murphy for The Local Rabbits and upon graduation was first cast on Mutant X. More recent credits include Good Witch, Reign, as Ann Gargan opposite Emmy nominated Tom Wilkinson, in the mini-series The Kennedys, Nelly McClean for BBC America's Copper and in the supporting roles of Jobina on Lost Girl and Bridget Bishop on Bitten for Syfy and Showcase. Recent credits include Salvation (CBS), Condor (DirectTV), Murdoch Mysteries (CBC), In the Dark (CW), Endlings (CBC/Hulu) and Mrs. America (FX). In 2022, Besharah appeared in season 1, episode 4 of Star Trek: Strange New Worlds.

Directing 
The first play Besharah directed, Just Another Day on the Hunt, was awarded Best Direction and Best Production at the University of Toronto Drama Festival. She has since directed 11 more, seven of which were original works. The Churkendoose was voted by the Toronto Star as a Top 10 Best Bet, and The Way was chosen by the Toronto Star as a Producer's Pick. Mad 5/Still Alive was given a 4 star review by Eye Magazine, as was The Keeper's Secret, their critic commenting, "You can't help feeling like you're seeing the future of theatre."

Besharah was co-artistic director of Sterling Studio Theatre from 2012 to 2014, directing Echoes by N. Richard Nash, By A Thread by Diane Flacks, Sailor's Song by John Patrick Shanley  and The Bear by Anton Chekhov. In the spring of 2019, Besharah directed Evermore Theatre's production of Sarah Burgess' Dry Powder to commercial success. Karen Fricker of the Toronto Star wrote "The primary reason to check out Besharah’s production is Liddiard’s go-for-broke performance: she commits, boy does she ever ... Besharah & Liddiard push the portrayal of Jenny daringly but successfully towards slapstick." Glenn Sumi of Now wrote, "... under director Angela Besharah, handle the biz speak with clarity and commitment. Besharah is especially good at getting the actors to physicalize their performances".

Her first short film, Now & Then, premiered at the San Diego International Children's Festival, and toured India with the WorldKids International Film Festival. It was screened at numerous festivals including the Brooklyn Film Festival  and the Artisan's Film Festival in the Hamptons, and was featured in The New York Times. She also directed two documentary shorts for the Get Involved! series on TVO. She has since directed two more narrative shorts, including Rive, which premiered at the Art Gallery of Ontario and winning Best Foreign Short in Atlanta. With You Always had its Canadian Premiere at the Canadian Film Festival and its U.S. premiere in California at the Newport Beach Film Festival.

Besharah coaches actors privately at Inside Light Studio and runs weekly On-Camera and Scene-Study classes out of her new studio The Lighthouse, in Toronto.

Awards 
Besharah directed and co-wrote  the short film Rive, which won Best Foreign Drama Short at the 2017 Atlanta Underground Film Festival.

Filmography

Film

Television

References

External links
 

Canadian film actresses
Canadian television actresses
Living people
Actresses from Ottawa
Female models from Ontario
Canadian theatre directors
University of Toronto alumni
Canadian artistic directors
Canadian film directors
1977 births